The women's 67 kg  competition in taekwondo at the 2004 Summer Olympics in Athens took place on August 28 at the Faliro Coastal Zone Olympic Complex.

China's Luo Wei narrowly outclassed the local favorite Elisavet Mystakidou of Greece in front of the raucous home crowd inside the Faliro Coastal Zone Olympic Complex to capture the gold medal in the event at 7–6. Meanwhile, South Korean fighter Hwang Kyung-Seon, who lost to Luo early in the opening match, mounted her strength throughout the repechage rounds to score a vigorous 5–2 victory for the bronze over Guatemala's Heidy Juárez.

Competition format
The main bracket consisted of a single elimination tournament, culminating in the gold medal match. The taekwondo fighters eliminated in earlier rounds by the two finalists of the main bracket advanced directly to the repechage tournament. These matches determined the bronze medal winner for the event.

Schedule
All times are Greece Standard Time (UTC+2)

Results
Legend
PTG — Won by points gap
KO — Won by knockout
SUP — Won by superiority
OT — Won on over time (Golden Point)
WO — Walkover

Main bracket

Repechage

References

External links
Official Report

Women's 067 kg
Olymp
Women's events at the 2004 Summer Olympics